Miracle: Letters to the President is a 2021 South Korean romantic drama film directed and co-written by Lee Jang-hoon for Blossom Pictures. Starring Park Jeong-min, Lee Sung-min, Im Yoon-ah and Lee Soo-kyung, the film is based on a true story of a high school mathematics genius Joon-kyeong. Set in 1980s in a remote township of North Gyeongsang Province, the film tells the story of establishing a simple, privately owned train station. 

The film was theatrically released on September 15, 2021, coinciding with Chuseok festival holidays. On box office  it ranks 8th among the Korean films released in the year 2021 in South Korea, with gross of US$5.61 million and 715,608 cumulative admissions.

Synopsis
This fictionalized film is based on the true story of a family in the 1980s living in a roadless remote area of North Gyeongsang Province.

Tae-yoon, an engineer, has as his life goal setting up a train station in his village,  which has tracks but no station. His son Joon-gyeong is a high school math prodigy. He works with his girlfriend Ra-hee, his older sister Bo-gyeong and the village residents to establish in 1988 a small train station that is privately owned and the first of its kind.

Cast
 Park Jeong-min as Jung Joon-kyeong
 Kim Kang-hoon as young Joon-kyeong
 Lee Sung-min as Jung Tae-yoon, Joon-kyeong's father
 Im Yoon-ah as Song Ra-hee
 Lee Soo-kyung as Jung Bo-kyeong - Joon-kyeong's older sister

Special appearance
 Ko Chang-seok as father of Ra-hee
Jung Moon Sung as Kim Yong Hwan, Joon-kyeong's physics teacher
Jo Yeon-hee as Villager

Production
On 9 June 2020, it was reported that Park Jeong-min, Im Yoon-ah and Lee Sung-min were considering the proposal of appearing in the film positively. On 25 August 2020, the cast was confirmed.

Principal photography began on August 2, 2020 The filming location was Gangwon Province, South Korea. The film set in 1988, was shot in an open set and filmed around Yucheon-ri, Jeongseon, and various other places in the province such as a house in Nakcheon-ri, Dogye Dongdeok branch school in Samcheok, High1 Chuchu Park, Wonju Ganhyeon Tourist Site, and Wonju Rail Bike.

Release
Lotte Entertainment released a special video clip and handwritten letters of Park Jeong-min and Im Yoon-ah to promote the film. It was scheduled to premiere in June 2021 but the release was postponed. It was released theatrically on September 15, 2021 coinciding with Chuseok festival.

The film was also screened at 1st Ulsan International Film Festival on December 19, 2021. It was also selected at 24th edition of Far East Film Festival held from April 22 to 30 2022, where it won Golden Mulberry award.

Reception

Box office
The film was released on September 15, 2021 on 1198 screens. As per Korean Film Council (Kofic) integrated computer network, the film ranks third on the Korean box office in opening weekend.

 it is at 8th place among all the Korean films released in the year 2021, with gross of US$5.61 million and 715,608 admissions.

Critical response
Kang Min-kyung of Star News reviewing the film lauded the performance of ensemble, especially acting of Lee Soo-kyung, saying, "Soo-kyung is the trump card and core of The Miracle". She liked the scenic beauty of locales and wrote, "Their [Park Jeong-min, Lee Seong-min, Lim Yoon-ah, and Lee Su-kyung] ensemble and the beautiful background where you can feel the four seasons from spring to summer, autumn, and winter add to the immersion and leave a lasting impression in the heart." Kang wrote about the film in the opening of review, "It touches the hearts of the viewers slowly and permeates. A genius boy's 'miracle' brings laughter and sometimes tears. This is the story of the movie The Miracle." Kim Seong-Hyun reviewing the film for YTN wrote that the performance of the actors was excellent but, "despite the strong performances of these actors, the film story is overly dramatic and weakens the narrative link. The conflict structure in the film and the process of resolving it are to the point that it feels forced and artificial.." Concluding the review Seong-Hyun said, " The Miracle ends with Richard Sanderson's famous song "Reality", which was also used in the movie La Boum in the 80s. The lyrics of the song 'Dream is my reality' are as beautiful as Junkyung's dream, but it is not enough to erase the bitter taste."

Kim Ji-eun of Newsis in her review praised the performances of 
Park Jeong-min, Yoona Lim, Lee Seong-min and Lee Soo-kyung, writing, "The character shines with the strong performances of the actors." She opined that the film set in 1980s have "captured the nostalgic sensibility of that era", and "the sentimental atmosphere of a rural village without a train station, with beautiful scenery and colors." Kim wrote that the "warmth" of narrative softly pervaded "with the landscape in harmony with nature". She concluded, "It started out as a simple station, but in the end it is a story about a dream."

Jung Yu-jin of News1 praised the performances of Park Jeong-min, Yoona Lim, Lee Seong-min and specially, Lee Soo-kyung, who in her opinion "is the heart of the film." Jung felt that "the warm sensibility and humor that flows throughout the film" made "The Miracle, a cute and moist growth narrative that brightens the heart."

Kim Ye-eun of Export News reviewing the film said, "The Miracle, which started with laughter and flowed into emotion, stimulates the tear glands with the warm story of these families. A strong reversal appears and sometimes adds to the emotion."

Accolades

References

External links
 
 
 
 
 

2020s Korean-language films
Lotte Entertainment films
South Korean romantic drama films
South Korean ghost films
Films postponed due to the COVID-19 pandemic
Films set in 1986
Films set in 1987
Films set in 1988
Rail transport films
Films set in North Gyeongsang Province
Films set in Seoul
South Korean films based on actual events
Films shot in Gangwon Province, South Korea